Marc Menard (born 1980) is a Canadian actor.  He starred as Michael Krieger on the MyNetworkTV serial Watch Over Me. His previous acting credits include All My Children, House, and the film John Tucker Must Die.

Filmography

External links

Living people
Canadian male television actors
Place of birth missing (living people)
1980 births